Bharat Masrani is an Indian-Canadian financial executive who is currently the Group President and Chief Executive Officer of the Toronto-Dominion Bank (also known as TD Bank Group). Masrani was appointed to this role on November 1, 2014.

Early life and education
Masrani is of Indian descent and was raised Hindu. He is of Gujarati descent. He was born in Uganda, a country from which his family fled in 1972.
Masrani graduated with Honours from York University in 1978 with a Bachelor of Administrative Studies. He earned his Master of Business Administration from the Schulich School of Business, York University in 1979. He was awarded an honorary degree from the Schulich School of Business in 2017 and an honorary doctorate from Mount Allison University in 2018.

Banking career
Masrani started his banking career in 1987 as a Commercial Lending Trainee at TD. Over the course of three decades, he went on to hold many senior executive roles across the bank, working in four different countries. In 1993, he was appointed Head of Corporate Banking in Canada. Two years later, Masrani relocated to Mumbai, India where he set up TD's first office in that country. In 1999, Masrani moved to London, England to lead TD's discount brokerage business TD Waterhouse in the UK as Senior Vice President.

Masrani returned to Toronto in 2003 as Vice Chair and Chief Risk Officer of TD Bank Group.

When TD expanded into the US with the acquisition of Banknorth in 2006, he moved to Portland as President of TD Banknorth. A year later, Masrani became President and Chief Executive Officer, TD Banknorth. In 2008, TD acquired Commerce Bancorp and integrated TD Banknorth to become TD Bank, N.A. Masrani became Group Head, US Personal and Commercial Banking and CEO of TD Bank, N.A.

When President and CEO W. Edmund Clark announced his upcoming retirement, this led to a succession planning contest between Masrani, Mike Pedersen (Group Head of Wealth, Insurance, and Corporate Office), and Tim Hockey (Group Head of Canadian Personal and Commercial Banking, as President and CEO of TD Canada Trust). In July 2013, Masrani was named Chief Operating Officer and CEO-designate of TD, and became President and CEO of TD on November 1, 2014 upon Clark's retirement.

Under his management which has included cutting costs and optimizing their operations, the stock has had a positive upward trend, and has received positive "buy" recommendations from analysts.

In 2018, Masrani was the highest paid Big 5 bank CEO with $15.3 million in total compensation.

References

External links
 Report on Business Magazine: Meet Bharat Masrani, the little known man taking over TD Bank 
 The Maclean's 2014 Power List

Canadian bankers
Living people
Schulich School of Business alumni
York University alumni
Gujarati people
Canadian people of Gujarati descent
Canadian people of Indian descent
Year of birth missing (living people)